Fabio Presca (4 December 1930 – 16 February 2008) was an Italian basketball player. He competed in the men's tournament at the 1952 Summer Olympics.

References

1930 births
2008 deaths
Italian men's basketball players
Olympic basketball players of Italy
Basketball players at the 1952 Summer Olympics
Sportspeople from Trieste